Fons Bastijns (28 January 1947 – 15 November 2008) was a former international Belgian footballer.

Honours

Player 

 Club Brugge

 Belgian First Division: 1972–73, 1975–76, 1976–77, 1977–78, 1979–80
 Belgian Cup: 1967–68 (winners), 1969–70 (winners), 1976–77 (winners), 1978-79 (finalists)
 Belgian Supercup: 1980
 UEFA Cup: 1975-76 (runners-up)
 European Champion Clubs' Cup: 1977-78 (runners-up)
 Jules Pappaert Cup: 1972, 1978
 Bruges Matins: 1979

References

External links
 Biography  at clubbrugge.be
 
 Fons Bastijns at weltfussball.de 
 
 

1947 births
2008 deaths
Belgian football managers
Belgian footballers
Belgium international footballers
Belgian Pro League players
Club Brugge KV players
Expatriate footballers in France
Ligue 2 players
R.W.D. Molenbeek players
USL Dunkerque players
Footballers from Antwerp
Association football defenders